Gerhard Hönicke (25 March 1930 – 5 November 1984) was a German long-distance runner. He competed in the 10,000 metres at the 1960 Summer Olympics and the marathon at the 1964 Summer Olympics.

References

External links
 

1930 births
1984 deaths
Athletes (track and field) at the 1960 Summer Olympics
Athletes (track and field) at the 1964 Summer Olympics
German male long-distance runners
German male marathon runners
Olympic athletes of the United Team of Germany
People from Meissen (district)
Sportspeople from Saxony
20th-century German people